Attorney General Goodman may refer to:

G. Aubrey Goodman (1862–1921), Attorney-General of the Straits Settlements
Meigh Goodman (1847–1928), Attorney General of British Honduras and Hong Kong